Catherine Ogle (born 12 May 1961) is a British Anglican priest. Since February 2017, she has been the Dean of Winchester. She was previously the Dean of Birmingham (2010–2017), and a parish priest in the Diocese of Ripon and Leeds and the Diocese of Wakefield.

Early life
Ogle was born on 12 May 1961 in Upminster, London. She is the daughter of Henry Charles Ogle and Josephine Ogle (née Bathard). She was educated at Perse School for Girls, a private school in Cambridge, Cambridgeshire. She studied at the University of Leeds, Fitzwilliam College, Cambridge and Westcott House.

Ordained ministry
She was ordained deacon in 1988, then served as assistant curate at St Mary's Church, Middleton, Leeds from 1988 to 1991. She then worked as a Religious Programmes Editor with BBC Leeds from 1991 to 1995. She was ordained priest in 1994 and served as priest in charge of Woolley with West Bretton from 1995 to 2001. Catherine became Vicar of Huddersfield in 2001. She was also chaplain at the University of Huddersfield from 2003 to 2006 and was made an honorary Canon at Wakefield Cathedral in 2008. In 2010, she was appointed Dean of Birmingham; she was instituted at Birmingham Cathedral on 2 September 2010. She was instituted Dean of Winchester on 11 February 2017. The 37th known successive such Dean of the Cathedral, the 22nd was incidentally Newton Ogle who died in 1804. She is the first woman to lead the Cathedral's day-to-day ministry.

References

1961 births
People from Upminster
People educated at the Perse School for Girls
Alumni of the University of Leeds
Alumni of Fitzwilliam College, Cambridge
Alumni of Westcott House, Cambridge
Provosts and Deans of Birmingham
Living people